Thierry Champion (born 31 August 1966) is a former professional tennis player from France.

Tennis career
Champion was born in Bagnols-sur-Cèze, Gard.  During his career, he reached the quarter-finals at the French Open in 1990 and at Wimbledon in 1991.

A clay court specialist, Champion gained notoriety on the men's ATP tour as a wild card player with the ability to inflict defeat on seeded players well above his ranking. His play style was characterised by fast court coverage and strong baseline play with measured heavily spun passing shots, particularly from an unorthodox backhand stroke.

Reaching a career-high singles ranking of World No. 44 on the men's ATP rankings in 1991, subsequent years saw a dwindling career riddled with injury.

One of the worst Grand Slam defeats in tennis history came when Champion was triple bageled, losing 6-0, 6-0, 6-0 in the 2nd round of the 1993 French Open, by eventual winner Sergi Bruguera. 

Champion was the coach of French tennis player Gaël Monfils starting in September 2004, but they parted ways in September 2006. He was also the coach of Hicham Arazi, Nicolas Escudé and Paul-Henri Mathieu. At the 2008 Wimbledon Championships he was seen to be coaching French player Richard Gasquet for a short stint.

ATP career finals

Singles: 1 (1 runner-up)

ATP Challenger and ITF Futures finals

Singles: 3 (2–1)

Performance timelines

Singles

Doubles

External links 
 
 

1966 births
Living people
People from Bagnols-sur-Cèze
French male tennis players
French tennis coaches
Sportspeople from Gard